Olivier Marleix (born 6 February 1971) is a French politician who has represented the 2nd constituency of the Eure-et-Loir department in the National Assembly since 2012. He is a member of The Republicans (LR).

Political career
Prior to his election to the National Assembly in 2012, Marleix was elected as Mayor of Anet in 2008, an office he held until his resignation in 2017 to focus on his parliamentary work. He also held a seat in the General Council of Eure-et-Loir from 2008 to 2014 for the canton of Anet. From 2008 to 2011, he held one of the general council's vice presidencies under the presidency of Albéric de Montgolfier.

In Parliament, Marleix serves on the Committee on Legal Affairs. From 2017 until 2018, he chaired a parliamentary inquiry into whether France's government should subject foreign takeovers of French firms it has cleared to parliamentary scrutiny. In addition to his committee assignments, he is a member of the French-Moroccan Parliamentary Friendship Group.

In 2018, Marleix was appointed to the shadow cabinet of The Republicans leader Laurent Wauquiez and tasked with the industry portfolio.

After Christian Jacob's election as party leader, Marleix announced his candidacy to succeed him as leader of the party's parliamentary group in the National Assembly in November 2019; he eventually lost to Damien Abad of Ain. Following the 2022 legislative election, Marleix again put his candidacy forward for parliamentary leader. He faced Julien Dive of Aisne, whom he defeated with 40 votes against 20. Marleix took over from acting parliamentary leader Virginie Duby-Muller on 22 June 2022.

Political positions
In The Republicans 2016 presidential primary, Marleix endorsed former President Nicolas Sarkozy as the party's candidate for the office of President of France. In The Republicans' 2017 leadership election, he endorsed Laurent Wauquiez. Ahead of the 2022 presidential election, he publicly declared his support for Michel Barnier as The Republicans' candidate.

See also
 2022 French legislative election

References

1971 births
Living people
Deputies of the 14th National Assembly of the French Fifth Republic
Deputies of the 15th National Assembly of the French Fifth Republic
Deputies of the 16th National Assembly of the French Fifth Republic
Deputies of Eure-et-Loir
Rally for the Republic politicians
Union for a Popular Movement politicians
The Republicans (France) politicians
Departmental councillors (France)
Mayors of places in Centre-Val de Loire
People from Boulogne-Billancourt
Politicians from Centre-Val de Loire
Sciences Po alumni